David John Hayward (1 March 1934 – 12 November 2003) was a  international rugby union player. Hayward played club rugby for Crumlin, Newbridge and first-class team Cardiff. He was chairman of Cardiff RFC from 1985 to 1986.

References

1934 births
2003 deaths
People from Crumlin, Caerphilly
Rugby union players from Caerphilly County Borough
Welsh rugby union players
Wales international rugby union players
Rugby union flankers
Loughborough Students RUFC players
Alumni of Loughborough University
Rugby union players from Crumlin